Okyere is a surname. Notable people with the surname include:

 Asante Gullit Okyere (born 1988), footballer
 Lawrence Adjei-Okyere (or Lawrence Adjei) (born 1979), footballer
 Edward Yaw Okyere Asafu-Adjaye (or Ed Asafu-Adjaye) (born 1988), footballer
 Nana Kwaku Okyere Duah known as Tic Tac (musician), hiplife musician 
 Simon Okyere , Lawyer
 Emmanuel Kwadwo Okyere Darko , Top Security Agent 
 Kofi Okyere Darko , Journalist
 Nana Yaw Okyere , Blogger